Dániel Nagy (born 9 April 1998) is a Hungarian racing driver currently competing in the World Touring Car Championship for Zengő Motorsport. He previously competed in the TCR International Series and the Hungarian Suzuki Swift Cup, where he won the title in 2013 and 2015 while still a teenager.

He is the brother of water polo player Viktor Nagy.

Racing career

Nagy began his career in 2011 in the Hungarian Suzuki Swift Cup, he won the championship in 2013 and 2015. In July 2015, it was announced that Nagy would make his TCR International Series debut with Zengő Motorsport driving a SEAT León Cup Racer. He competed at the Red Bull Ring round of the championship, qualifying in third on his debut. In March 2016 he was announced as part of Zengő's team for their 2016 World Touring Car Championship campaign, driving a Honda Civic. Nagy competed in the final five events of the 2016 WTCC season, with a best finish of 11th, which he achieved at the series finale in Qatar.

Racing record

Career summary

Complete TCR International Series results
(key) (Races in bold indicate pole position) (Races in italics indicate fastest lap)

Complete World Touring Car Championship results
(key) (Races in bold indicate pole position) (Races in italics indicate fastest lap)

† Did not finish the race, but was classified as he completed over 90% of the race distance.

Complete TCR Europe Touring Car Series results
(key) (Races in bold indicate pole position) (Races in italics indicate fastest lap)

† Driver did not finish the race, but was classified as he completed over 90% of the race distance.

Complete World Touring Car Cup results
(key) (Races in bold indicate pole position) (Races in italics indicate fastest lap)

References

External links
 

1998 births
Living people
Hungarian racing drivers
TCR International Series drivers
Sportspeople from Budapest
World Touring Car Championship drivers
World Touring Car Cup drivers
Cupra Racing drivers
Zengő Motorsport drivers
TCR Europe Touring Car Series drivers